The Morane-Saulnier Vanneau (en: plover) is a two-seat basic trainer built in France by Morane-Saulnier and ordered by the French Air Force.

Development
The Vanneau was a low-wing cantilever monoplane with a pilot and student in tandem under a long glazed canopy. It had a retractable tailwheel landing gear and the prototype was powered by a  Hispano-Suiza 12X inline engine.

The production MS.472 was powered by a  Gnome-Rhône 14M-05 14-cylinder radial engine and first flew on 12 December 1945, with deliveries to the French Air Force starting in December 1946. From December 1947 the French Navy received 70 of the MS.474 variant modified for carrier operations.

A re-engined version the MS.475 was produced from 1950 which had minor differences but was powered by a  Hispano-Suiza 12Y-45 V-12 engine. One MS.475 was modified as the MS.476 with an increase in wing surface area and another MS.475 was fitted with a Renault 12S-02 engine as the MS.477 in 1950. A proposed variant was the MS.478 which was to be fitted with an Isotta Fraschini Delta engine but was not built. One MS.472 was re-engined with a  SNECMA 14X-04 radial engine in 1952 but development was later stopped. The Vanneau remained in service with the French Air Force and Navy into the late 1960s.

Variants
MS.470
Prototype powered by a  Hispano-Suiza 12X inline engine, one built.
MS.471
Proposed variant powered by a Béarn 12B.
MS.472 Vanneau II
Production variant for the French Air Force powered by a  Gnome-Rhône 14M-05 piston engine; three prototypes and 230 production aircraft built.
MS.474 Vanneau IV
Carrier-capable production variant for the French Navy, powered by a Gnome-Rhône 14M-04; 70 built.
MS.475 Vanneau V
Improved version for the French Air Force powered by a  Hispano-Suiza 12Y-45 V12 engine; 201 built.
MS.476
One MS.475 modified with increased wing surface.
MS.477
One MS.475 powered by a  Renault 12S-02 inline engine.
MS.478
Projected Isotta Fraschini Delta inline powered variant, not built.
MS.479
Developed variant powered by a  SNECMA 14X-04 radial; one converted from a MS.472.

Operators

French Air Force
French Navy

Specifications (MS.475 Vanneau V)

See also

References

Further reading

 

1940s French military trainer aircraft
Vanneau
Single-engined tractor aircraft
Low-wing aircraft
Aircraft first flown in 1944